Kalakontak (also Romanized as Kalākontak; also known as Kalān Kantak and Kalān Kontak) is a village in Dalgan Rural District, in the Central District of Dalgan County, Sistan and Baluchestan Province, Iran. At the 2006 census, its population was 337, in 67 families.

References 

Populated places in Dalgan County